Roan is a village in Åfjord municipality in Trøndelag county, Norway. The Berfjorden and the island of Brandsøya lie just offshore of the village of Roan. Roan Church is located in the village.

The village was the administrative centre of the old Roan Municipality prior to 2020 when it was merged into Åfjord.

References

Villages in Trøndelag
Åfjord